The Dule Temple (Traditional Chinese: 獨樂寺; Simplified Chinese: 独乐寺; pinyin: Dúlè Sì; lit. 'Temple of Solitary Joy) is a Buddhist temple located in Jizhou District of suburban Tianjin, China. The temple is of historical as well as architectural significance. Its oldest surviving buildings are two timber-frame structures, the front gate and the central hall (pavilion) that houses a colossal clay statue of the Eleven-Headed manifestation of the Bodhisattva Guanyin (Avalokiteśvara). Both structures date back to the Liao dynasty and are among the oldest surviving wooden buildings in China.

History 

The origins of the Dule Temple date back at least to the early Tang Dynasty. However, no buildings from the Tang Dynasty era have survived on the site. The oldest buildings still in existence, the Shan Gate and the Guanyin Pavilion, were constructed during a renovation of the temple in the second year of Tonghe Emperor of the Liao Dynasty (984 AD). These buildings, both central features of the temple, were designed and constructed by local architects and craftsmen on the basis of the Tang architectural technology and carving techniques.

In 755, An Lushan held a rally in the Dule Temple at the onset of his rebellion against the Tang emperor. The name of the temple could be a reference to An Lushan, who was also known as An Dule. However, the name could also have originated from the Dule River that flows to northwest of the city, although it is not clear if the river's name predates that of the temple.

In 1928, a unit of soldiers commanded by warlord Sun Dianying was stationed in the Dule Temple and used the main hall as barracks. Sun Dianying and his troops were responsible for the looting of the nearby Eastern Qing Tombs. A leftover from the military occupation of the temple are bullet holes in the timber frames that were inflicted during target practice.

In the early 1930s, Dule Temple was studied by Liang Sicheng, the author of the China's first modern history on Chinese architecture. In the same decade, the temple was converted into the Jixian Village Normal School.

Description 
The grand temple complex is located in the north and faces the south.

Shanmen
The shanmen (Traditional Chinese: 山門; Simplified Chinese: 山门; pinyin: Shānmén) is a single-story building that stands 10 meters tall and has three single-eaves Wudian roofs (Traditional Chinese: 廡殿頂; Simplified Chinese: 庑殿顶; pinyin: Wǔdiàn Dǐng i.e., roofs with four slopes and five ridges). It functions as the front gate on the temple's south side and houses the statues of two guardian kings. The Chiwen on both ends of the main ridge are the origin structures made in the Liao dynasty (907-1125). Under the south eaves is a plaque which is said to be the handwriting of the prime minister Yan Song (1480-1567) in the Ming dynasty (1368-1644). Inside the hall are two colored clay statues of Heng and Ha made in the Liao dynasty and frescos of the Four Heavenly Kings drawn in the Qing dynasty (1644-1911).

Guanyin Pavilion
The Guanyin Pavilion (Traditional Chinese: 觀音閣; Simplified Chinese: 观音阁; pinyin: Guānyīn Gé) is a three-story timber structure with five single-eaves Xieshan roofs (Traditional Chinese: 歇山頂; Simplified Chinese: 歇山顶; pinyin: Xiēshān Dǐng, i.e., half-hipped, half-gabled roofs). The pavilion has a height of about 23 meters and consists of more than one thousand individual pieces. Inside the hall there is a clay statue of the Eleven-Headed Guanyin (Traditional Chinese: 十一面觀音; Simplified Chinese: 十一面观音; pinyin: Shíyīmiàn Guānyīn). The statue, measuring 16 meters in height, is the biggest of its kind in China. This statue of Guanyin was constructed in the Liao dynasty (907-1125), but the artistic style is similar to that in the flourishing period of the Tang dynasty (618-907). On both sides of the statue of Guanyin are statues of his attendants, also made in the Liao dynasty. The pavilion centers with the statue of Guanyin and has two rows of column pillars around. The design which sets dougong on the pillars and architraves on the dougong in each layer separates the pavilion into three stories and makes it easier for people to pay tribute to Guanyin from different angles. The architrave are placed around the statue and the patio formed in the center is covered with an octagonal caisson, which closely integrates  the entire interior space and the statue. The thousands of beams, columns and architraves in the pavilion are arranged in an ordered way with high technique, which shows the excellent wooden architecture technology and achievements in the Liao dynasty.

Gallery

Location 
The Dule Temple is located in the center of Jizhou District. Its address is 41 Wuding Street, Jizhou District, Tianjin.

Notes and references

See also
Pagoda of Fogong Temple, another wooden structure from the Liao Dynasty (built in 1056)

External links 
 Illustration of inner structures (Ji County is written as Jixian in the title there)

Buddhist temples in Tianjin
Guanyin temples
Liao dynasty architecture
Tang dynasty Buddhist temples
Timber framed buildings in China
Major National Historical and Cultural Sites in Tianjin
10th-century Buddhist temples
984 establishments
10th-century establishments in China
Colossal Guanyin statues